Adventures of Superman is an American television series based on comic book characters and concepts that Jerry Siegel and Joe Shuster created in 1938. The show was the first television series to feature Superman and began filming in 1951 in California on RKO-Pathé stages and the RKO Forty Acres back lot. Cereal manufacturer Kellogg's sponsored the show. The first and last airdates of the show, which was produced for first-run syndication rather than for a network, are disputed, but they are generally accepted as September 19, 1952, and April 28, 1958. The show's first two seasons (episodes 1–52, 26 titles per season) were filmed in black and white; seasons three through six (episodes 53–104, 13 titles per season) were filmed in color.

George Reeves played Clark Kent/Superman, with Jack Larson as Jimmy Olsen, John Hamilton as Perry White, and Robert Shayne as Inspector Henderson. Phyllis Coates played Lois Lane in the first season, with Noel Neill, who previously played Lois Lane in the film serials Superman (1948) and Atom Man vs. Superman (1950), stepping into the role in the later seasons. Superman battles crooks, gangsters, and other villains in the fictional city of Metropolis while masquerading "off duty" as Daily Planet reporter Clark Kent. For nearly all of the series' episodes, Lois Lane and Jimmy Olsen, Clark's colleagues at the office, found themselves in dangerous situations that only Superman's timely intervention can resolve.

The opening theme is known as The Superman March. In 1987, selected episodes of the show were released on VHS. In 2006, the series became available in its entirety on DVD to coincide with the DVD release of Superman Returns, the first Superman feature film to emerge after almost two decades without such a movie. The feature film Hollywoodland, released in 2006, dramatized the show's production and the death of its star, George Reeves.

Production 

In November 1951, California exhibitor and B-movie producer Robert L. Lippert released a 58-minute black-and-white film starring George Reeves and Phyllis Coates called Superman and the Mole Men, with a script by Robert Maxwell (as Richard Fielding) and direction by Lee Sholem. The film, shot that July, served as a pilot for Adventures of Superman and prompted the start of production of the first season in August/September of the same year. The series discontinued production, however, and remained unaired until September 1952, when cereal manufacturer Kellogg's agreed to sponsor the show (as the company had previously done with the Superman radio series). The success of the series came as a complete surprise to the cast. Looking back many years later, Jack Larson remembered that he was in New York City, and his newfound fame totally caught him off guard. The initial feature film, Superman and the Mole Men, was subsequently edited into a two-part story called "The Unknown People" and was to be broadcast mid season, but went unaired until it was added to the syndication package of some stations in 1960 after the sponsor left. It was the only multi-part story of the series and is sometimes broadcast as the "unofficial" season one finale.

After the first season's filming was completed, actress Phyllis Coates made other commitments and did not return as Lois Lane. Noel Neill, who had played the character in both Columbia theatrical serials, stepped into the role and remained until the series' cancellation. The core cast thereafter remained intact, with Phillips Tead occasionally joining the regulars in the last seasons as the eccentric recurring character Professor Pepperwinkle. To promote and advertise the show, cast members Reeves, Hamilton, and Larson were able to earn extra money by appearing in Kellogg's commercials during the second season. Noel Neill was never approached for these because sponsors worried that scenes of Clark Kent having breakfast with Lois Lane would be too suggestive.

From the beginning, the series was filmed like a movie serial, with principals wearing the same costumes throughout the show to expedite out-of-sequence shooting schedules and save budgetary costs. For instance, all scenes that took place in the "Perry White Office" set would be filmed back to back for future placement in various episodes. This was often confusing to the actors. Money was further saved by using a simple change of wall hangings to change Clark's office into Lois's office, thus dispensing with additional set construction. Other scenic shortcuts were employed. In the last seasons, for example, there were fewer exterior location shoots, and episodes were filmed almost entirely in the studio. 
The budget for the series was relatively low, with a complete episode averaging $15,000. The series' actors were paid $200 per episode; the show's historians and Jack Larson stated that the cast had to make repeated requests to producers and threaten to quit production before they were given a $50 raise. By the end of the run, star Reeves was making at least $2500 per episode, but the rest of the cast still made considerably less. The stars were signed to a "run of the show contract", meaning that the producers could demand their services to shoot a new season with thirty days' notice. This clause also prohibited them from doing any long-term commitments such as movies or plays.
Reeves's red, blue, and yellow Superman costume was originally brown, gray, and white so that it would come through in appropriate gray tones on black-and-white film. After two seasons, the producers began filming the show in color, a rarity for the time. Filming of the color episodes began in late 1954. Because of the added cost of filming in color, the producers cut the number of episodes per season in half. Each 26-week season would feature 13 new episodes and 13 reruns of the older black-and-white shows.

Throughout the last 50 episodes, a lackadaisical attitude toward flubbed lines prevailed, ascribed to deterioration of morale among cast and crew, the added expense of color filming and salary disputes. Producer Whitney Ellsworth later admitted: "Sometimes there was just garbage in the rushes, but we were often forced to use what we had, rather than relight the set and go again".

Black-and-white seasons, 1952–1954 

Phyllis Coates, like George Reeves, was a popular lead in B features of the period. For the TV series, Reeves asked that Coates receive equal star billing. Coates created a sharp, strong-willed Lois Lane, an enterprising reporter who tries to outscoop Clark Kent. Jack Larson's Jimmy Olsen is a Daily Planet intern, often investigating some wrongdoing. Usually the villains catch him, and Superman usually helps him in the nick of time. In the film noir-like early episodes, Superman himself is seen as a semi-mysterious presence, unknown to many of the crooks; in "The Riddle of the Chinese Jade", a villain says, "Who's the guy in the circus suit?" Eventually, all the crooks know exactly who he is, often with the bug-eyed exclamation "SOOPAH-man!" when he first appears. The first season's episodes usually featured action-packed, dark, gritty, and often violent story lines in which Superman fought gangsters and crime lords. Many characters met their deaths in these episodes. The deaths of some of them were actually shown.

When it came time to reassemble the cast and crew for filming the second season, Phyllis Coates was no longer available, having committed herself to another project. The producers then hired Noel Neill and gave her secondary billing with Larson, Hamilton, and Shayne. Neill's portrayal was sweeter and more sympathetic than the efficient, hard-as-nails Coates characterization. Bob Maxwell, whose episodes in the first season verged on the macabre, left the show, going on to produce Lassie in 1954. Whitney Ellsworth, already working on Adventures of Superman as an uncredited associate producer and story editor during the initial season, became the show's executive producer in 1953 and would remain so for the duration of the series. The second-season shows were still fairly serious in nature, retaining the film-noir/crime drama qualities while steering more in a science fiction direction, with Ellsworth tempering the violence significantly. With most of the villains becoming comic bunglers less likely to frighten the show's juvenile viewers and with only some occasional deaths, usually off screen, Kellogg's gave its full approval to Ellsworth's approach and the show remained a success. Sentimental or humorous stories were more evident than they had been during the first season. A large portion of the stories, however, dealt with Superman's personal issues, such as his memory loss in "Panic in the Sky".

Color seasons, 1954–1958 
With the color seasons, the show began to take on the lighthearted, whimsical tone of the Superman comic books of the decade. The villains were often caricatured, Runyonesque gangsters played in a tongue-in-cheek style. Violence on the show was toned down even further. The only gunfire that occurred was aimed at Superman, and, of course, the bullets bounced off him. Superman was less likely to engage in fisticuffs with the villains. On occasions when Superman did use physical force, he would take crooks out in a single karate-style chop or, if he happened to have two criminals in hand, by banging their heads together. More often than not, the villains were likely to knock themselves out fleeing Superman. At this point, Jimmy, who was very popular with viewers, was being played as the show's comic foil to Superman. Most of these plots had Jimmy and Lois being captured, only to have Superman rescue them at the last minute.

Scripts for the sixth and final season reestablished a bit of the seriousness of the show, often utilizing science fiction features like a kryptonite-powered robot, atomic explosions, and impregnable metal cubes. In one of the last episodes, "The Perils of Superman" (a takeoff on The Perils of Pauline), there was indeed deadly peril straight out of the movie serials: Lois was tied to a set of railroad tracks with a speeding train bearing down on her, Perry White was nearly sawed in half while tied to a log, Jimmy was in a runaway car headed for a cliff, and Clark Kent was immersed in a vat of acid. This was one of three episodes George Reeves directed himself. Noel Neill's hair was dyed a bright red for this season. ABC-TV aired episodes in its "Fun At Five" series during the 1957-58 season.

Reeves appeared as Superman in "Lucy and Superman", an episode of I Love Lucy that aired on January 14, 1957. In the episode, Reeves appears as himself playing TV's Superman, though no mention of George Reeves is ever made until the credits roll. The announcement "Our guest star tonight was George Reeves, star of the Superman series" was deleted from the episode after its first network broadcast. The episode was colorized and re-broadcast as part of an hour-long Lucy special on the CBS network on May 17, 2015.

Stamp Day for Superman 
At the request of the US Treasury Department, the production company made a special truncated film, with a run time of 17 minutes and 32 seconds, to promote school savings-stamp plans to children. Shown in grade schools during the 1950s, the decade of Adventures of Superman, this is the only "episode" of the series that has entered the public domain. It features Clark Kent/Superman, Jimmy Olsen and Lois Lane and plays like a normal black-and-white episode of the second season, with series semi-regulars Tristram Coffin, as a government spokesman, and Billy Nelson, as a criminal. Thomas Carr directed this film. This film was released on the Season Two DVD box set of The Adventures of Superman.

Locations 

Adventures of Superman began filming at the RKO-Pathé studios (later Desilu Studios) in Culver City, California, in August–September 1951. A low-budget program by the standards of its day, episodes cost roughly $15,000 apiece. In 1953–54, the show was filmed at California Studios and, in 1955, at Charlie Chaplin Studios. In 1956–57, the show was filmed at Ziv Studios.

The establishing shot of The Daily Planet building in the first season was the E. Clem Wilson Building in Los Angeles, California, on Wilshire Boulevard, for decades famous as the headquarters of Mutual of Omaha, its brilliant white globe atop a tall pillar a familiar landmark to local residents. The Carnation Milk Company Building a few blocks east on Wilshire served as The Daily Planets front door. From the second season onward, stock shots of the 32-story Los Angeles City Hall were used as the Planet building, and the sidewalk entrance to the Planet was a studio-bound "exterior".

Many exteriors in the first season were shot at the RKO Pictures backlot, called "Forty Acres", a facility later used for Mayberry, North Carolina, on The Andy Griffith Show. Hillsides in Culver City, city streets of downtown Los Angeles, or residential areas of the San Fernando Valley were sometimes used as exteriors during all six seasons. In later seasons, filming occurred on sound stages, with exterior shots, such as cars driving along roadways, shot as second-unit material, often with doubles at the wheel. Establishing shots of Queen of Angels Hospital in the Echo Park section of Los Angeles were often used in episodes (such as "The Face and the Voice") during the second season, although the hospital was identified as "Mercy General". Another Los Angeles stock footage landmark was the Griffith Observatory, which had several different "cameos" in the series, first serving as Jor-El's home/laboratory. Aside from a few clips of New York City in "Superman on Earth", most, if not all, of the stock clips used to depict Metropolis are of the Los Angeles area.

Opening sequence 
 
The show's title card (see infobox above right) imitated the three-dimensional lettering of the comic book covers. Occasional confusion arises about the article "the", since it was spoken by narrators in voice-overs. Some references title the show "The Adventures of Superman"; other books, as well as TV Guide listings, simply label the show "Superman". The onscreen title of the show is Adventures of Superman, with no article preceding "Adventures".

Bill Kennedy, framed by the show's theme music, voiced the opening narration of the show, expanded from that of the 1940s radio show and the 1940s Superman cartoons. The opening narration of the show set the stage for each program:

From the second season onward, the final sentence ("and now, another exciting episode in the Adventures of Superman!") was dropped. In later syndication, when Kellogg's was no longer the sponsor, the episode openings were re-edited to remove the opening line relating to the cereal company.

Music 
The score for the series was taken from stock music libraries, often adaptations of music from B-movies. For example, one cue used in the episode "Peril by Sea" also appears in Plan 9 from Outer Space. Another cue, used in the second season episodes "The Machine that Could Plot Crimes", "Jungle Devil", The Clown Who Cried", and "The Golden Vulture", came from the seventh variation of Miklos Rozsa's "Theme, Variations & Finale. Op. 13, from 1933. Apparently the only original music written for the series was the March heard primarily during the credits. The theme is ascribed to studio music arranger Leon Klatzkin, although it may have been adapted from an earlier unrelated, and now lost, theme. The main theme, based on a triad, matched the three syllables in the character's name, as has been the case with nearly all Superman music. With the exception of the title theme, musical cues ranged from the serious to the lighthearted and were different for each of the seasons, except for the third season, wherein some cues from the previous season would be reused in a number of episodes. Each season's cues tended to be used repeatedly from episode to episode, in similarly appropriate "mood" moments such as apprehension, humor or fast action. The opening credits theme, Superman's "leitmotif", was often (though not always) used whenever Superman was depicted flying or taking action.

Sponsor 
The show's sponsor was Kellogg's, maker of corn flakes and other breakfast cereals. The characters from the TV series, except Lois Lane and Superman himself, made a number of TV commercials promoting their cereal products. These commercials were usually shown as "integrated commercials" at the end of the program. Some of these commercials are preserved in the DVD series as special features. Some versions of the show contained a vocal introduction, "Kellogg's, 'The Greatest Name In Cereals', presents ... The Adventures of Superman". The sponsor originally requested to have this line placed, at the intro's start, on every single episode of the series, as well as—from second season onward—the company's logo on the intro and on the end of the closing credits. When Kellogg's ceased being the show's sponsor, the logo and the intro line were removed from some prints, especially when Warner Bros. Television received distribution rights.

Flying effects 

 
While considered simple by today's standards, the "flying" effects on Adventures of Superman were advanced for the period, although during season one it was apparent that, for distance flight shots, Superman was lying on a flat surface, his torso and thighs noticeably flattened between elbows and knees. Throughout the series, Superman's "flying" involved three phases: take-off, flight, and landing. Cables and wires were used for Superman's take-offs early in filming. During filming of the 'Superman and the Mole Men' feature, the wires supporting Reeves snapped, and he fell to the studio floor. For the entirety of season one episodes, stuntmen took Reeves' place whenever cables and wires were used for take offs. At the end of season one, cables and wires were discarded for take offs (and later dropped all together by season two's end) and special effects head Daniel "Danny" Hays left the series. By this time, a springboard was brought in for take off scenes, designed by the series other SFX supervisor, Thol "Si" Simonson, who remained with the series until its end. Reeves would run into frame and hit the out-of-frame springboard, which would boost him out of frame, sometimes over the camera, and onto padding. The springboard had enough force, along with subtle camera manipulation, to make it look as though he was actually taking off. A relatively few number of repeated shots became the flying scenes. The typical technique had footage of Reeves stretched out on a spatula-like device formed to his torso and leg, operated on a counterweight like a boom microphone, allowing him to bank as if in flight. In a couple of later episodes, such as "The Atomic Secret", Reeves simulated flying, opting to lie on the device without the molded form to support his legs, which are seen to hang from the waist in those episodes in marked contrast to the stock footage of Superman in flight.

In the two monochrome seasons, Reeves was occasionally filmed in front of aerial footage on a back-projection screen or against a neutral background which would provide a matte which would be optically combined with a swish-pan or aerial shot. That footage was matted onto various backgrounds depending on the needs of the episode: clouds, buildings, the ocean, mountain forests, etc., by which he would appear to fly. For the color episodes, the simpler and cheaper technique of a neutral cyclorama backing was used, usually sky-blue, or black for night shots. Techniques for landings involved Reeves jumping off a ladder or holding an off-camera horizontal bar and swinging down into frame.

Cast

Main characters

 George Reeves as Kal-El / Clark Kent / Superman, a being from the planet Krypton, who is rocketed to Earth in his infancy. Sent by his parents, Jor-El and Lara from the dying planet, Krypton, he lands near Smallville on April 10, 1926. He grows to manhood under the adoptive parental care of Eben and Sarah Kent, who raised him and named him Clark. As an adult, he moves from Smallville to Metropolis after his father, Eben, dies, in 1951. In Metropolis, he becomes a Daily Planet reporter under his human name of Clark Kent. Despite the show's introduction describing Kent as "mild-mannered" and colleagues constantly calling him "timid" and even "spineless", Clark Kent is mildly assertive and authoritative during situations when he is not Superman. He frequently takes charge in emergencies and is not afraid to take reasonable risks. He puts his superpowers to work battling crime in Metropolis and is often called upon to rescue his associates Jimmy Olsen and Lois Lane. The Superman of the television series developed superpowers beyond his precursors in radio, cartoons, comics, and theatrical serials. On occasion, he separated his molecules to walk through walls, isolating a particular voice over multiple telephone lines long distance while flying, became invisible, and split in two while retaining his traditional powers of X-ray vision, microscopic vision, super-speed, super-hearing, super-breath, super-strength, flying, and a mastery of foreign languages. Both Superman's Kryptonian parents, Jor-El and Lara, and his adoptive Earth parents, the Kents, appear only in the premiere episode, "Superman on Earth".
 Phyllis Coates (season 1) and Noel Neill (season 2-6) as Lois Lane, a reporter of the Daily Planet and Clark Kent's associate. She is a well-dressed, competent professional woman. She suspects Kent is Superman and awaits an opportunity to confirm her suspicions. Lane is stated as being 26 years old in the 1957 episode "The Tomb of Zaharan". She returns to her hometown in the season-one episode "The Deserted Village".
 Jack Larson as Jimmy Olsen, a cub reporter and photographer with the Daily Planet and an associate of Kent and Lane. He serves as the show's comic relief. Jimmy's mother makes an appearance in an early episode. Though boyish in his tastes and sense of humor, Jimmy occasionally displays mature astuteness, courage, and judgment. Larson's credit was elevated to the first position on the featured cast page over Noel Neil for the last two full color seasons. 
 John Hamilton as Perry White, the blustering, impatient editor and publisher of the Daily Planet. He is sometimes a participant in the dangerous exploits of Lois and Jimmy as they pursue news stories. He treats crooks and thugs with disdain and lofty contempt—in one episode, he mentions that he was once a crime reporter. Perry's sister Kate appears in the first-season episode "Drums of Death"; he has a nephew, Chris, who appears in the second-season episode "Jet Ace".
 Robert Shayne as Inspector Henderson of the Metropolis Police, a friend of the Daily Planet staff who often works in conjunction with them on crime investigations. Henderson has a teenage son named Ray who appears in one episode. Henderson was the creation of the radio series writers.

Recurring characters 

 Phillips Tead as Professor Pepperwinkle, an elderly, absent-minded inventor whose gadgets cause Superman much trouble and concern in five episodes during the last three color seasons.
 Sterling Holloway as Professor Oscar Quinn, an eccentric inventor making two appearances in the second season. Holloway played a similar character, Professor Twiddle, in the third-season episode "Through the Time Barrier".
 Danny Sue Nolan (as Dani Nolan), Aline Towne and Almira Sessions as Miss Bacharach, a nervous, easily excited, and easily fooled receptionist at the Daily Planet who appears in three first-season episodes and is mentioned in two others.
 Everett Glass as Professor Lucerne, an old friend of Superman's who advises him in matters scientific. Lucerne appeared in two consecutive episodes in the final season.

Special appearances
Tris Coffin; Herb Vigran; John Eldredge, best known as Harry Archer on Meet Corliss Archer (1954); Philip Van Zandt; and Ben Welden made multiple appearances over the course of the show, always as different villains.

Actors who landed Superman guest appearances early in their careers include:
 Claude Akins as Ace Miller, criminal in "Peril by Sea". Akins previously appeared with George Reeves two years earlier in the movie From Here To Eternity, and would later play Sheriff Lobo on the 1970s television series B. J. and the Bear and The Misadventures of Sheriff Lobo.
 Mabel Albertson as Kate White, Perry White's sister, in "Drums of Death".
 John Banner  played a butler to a wealthy individual. Banner later became famous as Sgt. Schultz on Hogan's Heroes.
 Hugh Beaumont as Dan Grayson, an ex-convict wanting to reform his life, in "The Big Squeeze". Beaumont is best known for his portrayal of Ward Cleaver on the series Leave It to Beaver, from 1957 to 1963.
 John Beradino as Dexter Brown, in "The Unlucky Number". Beradino would later become better known to soap opera fans as Dr. Steve Hardy on the long-running soap opera General Hospital.
 James Brown as Jim Carson in "Around the World with Superman" (1954).
 Paul Burke as Ace, a criminal, in "My Friend Superman"; Matthew Tips in "Superman Week"; and Rosy in "The Phantom Ring". Burke later starred in the 1960s series Naked City and Twelve O'Clock High.
 Jimmy Dodd as Jake in "Double Trouble".
 Chuck Connors as Sylvester Superman in "Flight to the North"; his later The Rifleman supporting player Paul Fix had appeared in "Czar of the Underworld" and "Semi-Private Eye".
 Billy Gray as Alan, a teenager who snaps a photo of Superman that may reveal the superhero's earthly identity in "Shot in the Dark". Gray would become known as "Bud" Anderson, Jr. in the situation comedy Father Knows Best.
 Dabbs Greer, in "Superman on Earth", the premiere episode, as a man falling from a dirigible; as a man falsely convicted of murder in "Five Minutes to Doom"; and in the dual roles of Mr. Pebble / Dan Dobey in "The Superman Silver Mine". Greer would become well known years later as Reverend Alden on the television series Little House on the Prairie.
 Ed Hinton as Cave Man in "Through the Time Barrier" and as Joe in "The Phantom Ring".
 Russell Johnson as Chopper in "The Runaway Robot". Johnson was later best known for his role as The Professor in Gilligan's Island.
 Joi Lansing as Sergeant Helen J. O'Hara, a policewoman posing as the titular character in the episode "Superman's Wife".
 Tyler MacDuff as Frankie in "The Boy Who Hated Superman".
 Eve McVeagh as Mrs. Wilson in "The Stolen Elephant".
 Vic Perrin as a sailor called "Scurvy" in "The Golden Vulture".
 Ann Tyrrell as Miss Walton in the first-season episode "The Deserted Village".

Other veteran film and television actors making appearances on the show included Dona Drake, George E. Stone, James Craven, Dan Seymour, Victor Sen Yung, Maudie Prickett, John Doucette, Norma Varden, Roy Barcroft, Elizabeth Patterson, and George Chandler.

Director Tommy Carr's brother Steve appeared as an unbilled extra in nearly every one of the first 26 shows and frequently in more substantial character roles. He was also the show's dialogue director and was the man pointing "up in the sky" in the introductions of the black-and-white shows.

Episodes

Episodes follow Superman as he battles gangsters, thugs, mad scientists and non-human dangers like asteroids, robots, and malfunctioning radioactive machines. In the first episode—the "origin" episode—Superman's infant life on the planet Krypton, his arrival on Earth, and a family couple nurturing and raising him are dramatized. In succeeding episodes, he conceals his super-identity by posing as mild-mannered Daily Planet reporter Clark Kent who, in times of crisis, dashes into the Daily Planets storeroom, or an alley, sheds his street clothes, and reappears in superhero tights and trunks, all at super-speed, to rescue hapless folks from the clutches of evildoers.

Themes 
Superman arrived on television in 1952 with a mythology established through comic books, a novel, a radio series, two theatrical serials, and seventeen Max Fleischer animated shorts. None of Superman's established foes like Lex Luthor appeared in the TV series, and the most potent element incorporated into the show from the established mythology was green kryptonite; the other versions (red, white, blue, gold, etc.) didn't appear. Several episodes featured the substance as a plot device. Another element appropriated from the mythology for the television series was Lois Lane's suspicions regarding Clark Kent's true identity and her romantic infatuation with Superman.

Cancellation and aftermath 
In 1958, producer Whitney Ellsworth created Superpup, a never-aired spin-off pilot that placed the Superman mythos in a fictional world populated by dogs. Featuring live-action actors in dog-suits portraying canine versions of Superman and other characters, the pilot was filmed on Adventures of Superman sets and was intended to capitalize on the success of its parent series.

Producers planned to continue Adventures of Superman in 1959 with two more years' worth of episodes, to begin airing in the 1960 season. The death of actor John Hamilton threw the plan into disarray. Actor Pierre Watkin was hired to replace Hamilton as "Perry White's brother". Watkin had played Perry White himself in the two Columbia serials and had guested on the series before.

The sudden death of the show's star George Reeves in June 1959 was not the end of the series either, in the producers' eyes. When Jack Larson returned from Europe after the death of Reeves, producers suggested the series could continue as "Superman's Pal, Jimmy Olsen", with more focus on Larson's character, playing opposite a "Superman" who would be a composite of stock shots of George Reeves and a stunt double to be filmed from behind. Larson rejected the idea.

Another spin-off idea was a pilot Whitney Ellsworth produced in 1961: The Adventures of Superboy. Johnny Rockwell starred as a young Clark Kent in Smallville. As Superboy, he wore a suit similar in design to George Reeves' suit. Although thirteen scripts had been written, only the pilot was filmed.

Neill and her original 1948 Superman serial co-star, Kirk Alyn, enjoyed cameos in the 1978 film Superman as Lois Lane's parents. Their dialogue scene was cut for theatrical release, but played in its entirety when the film was broadcast on TV, and later in the 2001 director's cut restoration. Neill and Jack Larson both made guest appearances on the TV series Superboy in the episode "Paranoia" during the show's fourth season.

Larson was cast as a man-on-the-street in an American Express ad called The Adventures of Seinfeld and Superman. Larson also had a guest appearance on Lois & Clark: The New Adventures of Superman, playing an elder Jimmy Olsen. Like Neill, Larson participated in various conventions connected with Superman. He also provided commentaries for some of the episodes on the DVD releases during 2005 and 2006 and the 2006 documentary history of the Superman character, Look, Up in the Sky.

Robert Shayne received a recurring role as "Reggie", the blind newspaper vendor, in The Flash in 1990–91 because the producers were aware of his Superman connection. Shayne was, in fact, legally blind by that time.

Phyllis Coates played the part of Lois Lane's mother in a 1993 episode of Lois & Clark: The New Adventures of Superman at the suggestion of Lois & Clark guest star (and George Reeves biographer) Jim Beaver. The Coates Orphanage in Metropolis, which appears in the Lois and Clark episode "Season's Greedings", is named for her.

Both Noel Neill and Jack Larson had minor roles in the 2006 movie Superman Returns. Neill played the multimillionaire wife of Lex Luthor, played by Kevin Spacey, who dies at the beginning of the film, leaving her entire inheritance to Luthor, while Larson played a bartender.

Media information

Copyright dates 
Episode copyright dates are confusing. When the series went into syndicated reruns, Kellogg's ceased being the show's sponsor and its name had to be removed from the opening titles. During the first decade of reruns, when all episodes were still shown in black and white, each episode's opening had the Kellogg's reference edited out, sometimes incompletely, leaving portions of "the greatest name in cereals, presents" in the finished product.

In every print since the network run (including the video and DVD releases), the 52 black-and-white shows appear to have been made in 1951, and the 52 color shows all seem to be from 1957. This is because the opening credits were standardized for syndication: a vintage-1951 opening was spliced onto the black-and-white shows, and a vintage-1957 opening was added to the color shows. The closing credits have the correct, unchanged copyright dates.

Home media

In 1987 and 1988, coinciding with the 50th anniversary celebrations of the Superman comic book character that year, Warner Home Video released selected episodes of the series to VHS and LaserDisc, under the TV's Best Adventures of Superman title, with four volumes released in total. Each volume contained one black-and-white episode and one color episode, plus a Max Fleischer Superman animated short. These videos were later re-released during the mid-1990s under new packaging artwork. Columbia House released 20 VHS volumes of the series under their Adventures of Superman: The Collector's Edition series, with each videotape containing three episodes, which was only available through mail order subscriptions during the 1990s. In 2003, Truth, Justice, & The American Way: The Life And Times Of Noel Neill, The Original Lois Lane was published, and, in 2007, the film Hollywoodland was released to DVD.

Warner Home Video has released all 6 seasons of The Adventures of Superman on DVD in Region 1. Warner has also released Seasons 1–4 in Region 2 & 4.

Reception

Critical reviews 
On April 8, 1953, Variety reviewed the April 1 New York premiere: "It's to National Comics credit that its television version is restrained on the scripting side and well done technically ... Filming is top-notch, with no expense spared to get those special effects. George Reeves, who acts Superman, doesn't have too much of a role in the initial pix, since most of it deals with boyhood of the hero, but he registered nicely as the meek reporter and as the hero. Phyllis Coates was okay as Lois Lane, the girl reporter, while John Hamilton fits the fictitious concept of the editor. Other roles were well handled".

Awards and nominations 
The show received a proclamation in July 2001 on its 50th Anniversary from the Los Angeles County Board of Supervisors in a ceremony that Jack Larson; Noel Neill; Robert Rockwell, who played Jor-El in "Superman on Earth"; Jeff Corey, from the pilot Superman and the Mole Men; Mrs. Robert Shayne; and Mrs. Jerome Siegel attended. DC Comics Vice President Paul Levitz accepted the proclamation scroll.

In 2006, the show's first season received a Saturn Award nomination from the Academy of Science Fiction, Fantasy and Horror Films for "Best Retro Television Release on DVD". In 2007, the show's complete six seasons received a Saturn Award for "Best Retro Television Series Release on DVD".

References

External links

 Official DC Comics Website
 
 Adventures of Superman at SupermanHomepage.com
 "Stamp Day for Superman" episode at the Internet Archive

 
1952 American television series debuts
1958 American television series endings
American action television series
American adventure television series
Black-and-white American television shows
English-language television shows
First-run syndicated television programs in the United States
Saturn Award-winning television series
Superman television series
Television shows based on DC Comics
Television shows set in the United States